Frank Clarence "Crash" Arnett (born June 2, 1932) was a Canadian professional hockey player who played 529 games in the Western Hockey League for the Seattle Bombers, Winnipeg Warriors, Seattle Totems and Los Angeles Blades.

External links
 

1932 births
Living people
Canadian ice hockey defencemen
Ice hockey people from Manitoba
Los Angeles Blades (WHL) players
People from Carman, Manitoba
Seattle Bombers players
Seattle Totems (WHL) players
Winnipeg Warriors (minor pro) players